The 1998 3 Nations Cup rosters consisted of 64 players from three women's national ice hockey teams.

Canada
On November 2, 1998, Hockey Canada named its final 21-woman roster for the tournament. Canada was led by three coaches at the tournament—head coach Danièle Sauvageau and assistant coaches Karen Hughes and Ken Dufton.

 Head coach:

Skaters

Goaltenders

Finland
Finland entered the tournament with a 23-woman roster.

Skaters

Goaltenders

United States
The United States entered the tournament with a 20-woman roster.

 Head coach:

Skaters

Goaltenders

References

4 Nations Cup rosters